Relocation may refer to: 
 Relocation (computing)
 Relocation of professional sports teams
 Relocation (personal), the process of vacating a fixed residence in favour of another
 Population transfer
 Rental relocation
 Structure relocation
 Car relocation

See also 
 Relocation service
 Myka Relocate
 Moving (disambiguation)
 Relocation center → Internment